Bishmizzine, or Bishmezzine, Bechmezzine, Beshmizzine, Bishmezzine, thought to be neo-Assyrian (Bit Gismeia), is a Greek Orthodox village, in the Koura district of the North Governorate of Lebanon. It is about 275 meters above sea level. Bishmizzine borders the villages of Afisdeeq, Kfar-Hazir, Amyoun, Fi', and B'terram.

History
Bishmizzine has a huge historical heritage, starting from the pre-historic period. Archaeological evidence covers a period from the Paleolithic/Mesolithic Age to the Bronze Age and Iron Age, up to the late Ancient/Byzantine Age to the Islamic/Middle Age. The name Bishmizzine is thought to be derived from the Aramaic word “Bit Gismeia”, which dates back to the Neo-Assyrian Empire (911–609 B.C.). Additionally, one of the several churches of Bishmizzine, Saydeh (Virgin Mary), dates back to the Crusader Era (between 1095 and 1291 AD) and contains the typical ecclesiastical characteristics one would see in Crusader architecture. During the Era of the Crusades in the 13th century, Bishmizzine was called Besmedin. From 1220, it was the seat of an independent rule as a fief of the Count of Tripoli, which was assigned to Lord Bartolomeo Embriaco, a branch of the Lords of Gibelet (modern-day Byblos). The crusaders had developed Besmedin to include a castle or a fortified manor, but no traces of such are preserved today as it is believed they were razed to the ground during the Muslim Mamluk invasion and capture of Tripoli.

In the mid to late 19th century, Bishmizzine relied heavily on silkworms and silk spinning/weaving with 5 large factories each sustaining at least 40 workers.

During World War I, Bishmizzine was one of the many towns in the Mutasarrifate of Mount Lebanon, a semi-autonomous region in the Ottoman Empire and a precursor to modern-day Lebanon, to fall victim to the 
Great Famine of Mount Lebanon. Around 200,000 people starved to death in Mount Lebanon, at a time when its population was estimated at 400,000 people. This resulted in the highest fatality rate by population of World War I. Hundreds had starved to death in Bishmizzine.

People
Bishmizzine is known for its export of intellectuals. The genetic lineage is mixed as is the whole of Lebanon. The inhabitants are representative of the Levantine/Mediterranean genetic pool. The people are friendly, educated and hospitable. Surnames did not seem to be widely used until the 17th or 18th century, therefore, a man's surname was his father's first name. Additionally, in many cases, the family name “Najjar” was usually adopted by families with no given surname.

Notable Personalities
Nicolas Hayek (Founder and former CEO of The Swatch Group)

Nick Hayek Jr. (CEO of The Swatch Group)

Nayla Hayek (Chair of the Board of Directors of The Swatch Group)

Leila Tannous (pioneering journalist)

Raif Geha (Chief, Division of Immunology, Harvard Medical School)

Religious Diversity
The residents are mainly  Greek Orthodox.
There is a minority of Sunni Muslims. There are several historical churches and a mosque and local shrines throughout the village.  In addition, there are also residents of other Christian sects, such as Maronite and Protestant.

Geography

Environmental Features
Bishmizzine rests in the middle of the Koura plain, probably one of the largest uninterrupted olive groves in the world. It is bordered by hills and thus winter rain flows in water ways down to the town. The village rests on a large aquifer and this underground water body partially explains the extremes in climate when compared to neighbouring villages. For example, thin ice develops overnight in winter while it does not in neighbouring villages. At night the temperature may differ by 5 to 7 degrees C lower than the nearby adjacent surrounding hills or neighboring villages. Another factor that may play a role in explaining this climate conundrum is the fact that Bishmizzine rests in the plain at the base of the Western Lebanese Range of mountains and is surrounded by hills which act to trap any cold air that may flow by convection down the range from as high up as the Cedars of Lebanon in Bcharre. Hence there was a climatology station for the government in the village that utilized the temperature of the plain at 4 to 5 am before sunrise in an equation to arbitrarily calculate the temperature at the top of the mountain range. In the old days this environmental phenomena was counteracted by a pine forest that used to blockade the cold night air advancing down the mountain slopes towards the town. Remnants of this pine forest remain to this day and act as a picnic zone visited by many. The argylls soil in Bishmizzine has been sought after by cement factories that find its characteristics favorable for quality cement production. This has been a blessing and a curse at the same time. The blessing is obviously financial for the land owner and jobs created in the nearby cement factories. However, the environmental impact has been catastrophic. Huge deep excavation areas emptied of soil remained after the removal of the soil. These areas then filled up with rain water during the winter and resulted in a swamp/wetland like environment with rising humidity. The damp environment as well as soil erosion have rendered the surrounding area susceptible to fungal diseases ex olive leaf spot or peacock eye spot Spilocea oleaginea  which infested initially the area around the excavations and then spread to involve the surrounding olive fields rendering the once productive olive groves unproductive. This disease now infests olives in an area up to 4 km away from the epicenter. Noteworthy is the recent natural transformation of these excavation sites from a swamp to a wetland habitat with flora and fauna uncharacteristic of Lebanon. This transformation has recently stopped soil erosion and stabilized the habitat. Also this phenomenon has become a source of inquiry for botanists curious as to where some of the atypical flora came from ex. reeds characteristic of the Nile or Danube. Since Bishmizzine lies on the route of migratory birds some experts have postulated that the water holes became a rest area for migrating birds ex storks and hence the seeds were carried in their feathers from distant areas. The disease burden of fungal olive disease peacock eye remains high however and a concerted effort by farmers, government and NGOs is needed. A large area of Bishmizzine remains free of fungal disease and produces some of the best extra virgin olive oil and table olives in the area.

Climate
The climate of Bishmizzine is characterized by a dry-summer subtropical Mediterranean climate, and thus has moderate weather throughout the seasons. Summers are hot and dry, while winters are rainy with occasional light snow.

Education

Bishmizzine High School
Bishmizzine High School was founded in 1937, making it one of the oldest continually operational private schools in North Lebanon. The school offers a full educational program from Nursery to Baccalaureate II designed to be compatible with the requirements of the Lebanese Ministry of Education.

Global Emigration
One of the many Lebanese villages where the number of inhabitants is very small compared to the number of its natives who live abroad. Global emigration occurred as far back as the mid 19th century with records showing young men and families migrating to the new world, mainly Australia and the Americas (North and South). This emigration was greatly hastened after the economic ill fortunes of the silk textile factories after the advent of cheap artificial silk by the far east. Then successive world wars, The Great Famine of Mount Lebanon (1916), and the Lebanese Civil War (1975–1990) also took their toll. Emigration continues till the present day. Some families are extinct and others are greatly reduced in number.  During holidays, especially summer, many of the natives return to visit their relatives.

References

External links
 Bechmizzine, Localiban
 Bishmezzine.com
 Bishmizzine Orthodox Parish

Populated places in Lebanon
Eastern Orthodox Christian communities in Lebanon